The Biakoye constituency is one of the constituencies represented in the Parliament of Ghana. It elects one Member of Parliament (MP) by the first past the post system of election. It is located in the Biakoye district of the Oti Region of Ghana.

Boundaries
The constituency is located within the Biakoye district of the Oti Region of Ghana. To the north is the Krachi East district, to the west, the Volta River, to the south the Hohoe Municipal and Kpando Municipal districts which are both in the Volta Region and to the east, the Ghana - Togo border. The constituency was originally located within the Volta Region of Ghana until new Regions were created following the December 2018 referendum.

Members of Parliament

Elections

See also
List of Ghana Parliament constituencies

References 

Adam Carr's Election Archives
Ghana Home Page

Parliamentary constituencies in the Oti Region